Loaded is the first novel by Australian writer Christos Tsiolkas. It was first published in 1995, and was adapted into the 1998 film Head On. Loaded was adapted as an audio play by the Malthouse Theatre company in 2020.

Plot
The novel describes twenty-four hours in the life of "Ari", an angst-ridden young gay Greek Australian. Ari travels across the city of Melbourne, Australia, taking speed, cocaine and smoking marijuana whenever presented to him. He is uncomfortable with his homosexuality, favours no strings attached hook-ups with anonymous, masculine suitors who debase or demean their own homosexuality, and is regularly at odds with friends as well as family.

Publication
When Tsiolkas submitted the manuscript of Loaded to an independent publisher, it was rejected as "racist and homophobic".

References

1995 Australian novels
1990s LGBT novels
Novels by Christos Tsiolkas
Novels with gay themes
Australian LGBT novels
Novels set in Melbourne
1995 debut novels